Isospidia angustipennis is a moth in the family Drepanidae. It was described by Warren in 1904. It is found in Cameroon, the Central African Republic, Ghana, Ivory Coast, Nigeria and Uganda.

References

Moths described in 1904
Drepaninae